The term Battle of Nogales may refer to:
Battle of Nogales (1913)
Battle of Nogales (1915)
Battle of Ambos Nogales (1918)